Hubbard Site is an Ancestral Puebloan archeological site located in Aztec Ruins National Monument, New Mexico. The tri-wall structure, which resembles a similar building found at Pueblo del Arroyo, was excavated in 1953.

References

Bibliography

Colorado Plateau
Ancestral Puebloans
Post-Archaic period in North America
Archaeological sites in New Mexico
Chaco Canyon
Chaco Culture National Historical Park